Bonnier LLC (formerly Bonnier Corporation) is an "outdoor adventure company" that "fuels passion for fishing, boating, sailing, motorsports, hunting and travel." Bonnier describes itself as having the nation’s leading portfolio of experiential events and iconic media brands in the marine category, and a series of nationwide motorsports and hunting events. Publisher of Salt Water Sportsman, Marlin, Sport Fishing, Boating, Yachting, Cruising World and Sailing World, Bonnier produces SFTV television programming, and hosts fishing tournaments, sailing regattas and educational events in the U.S. and in Mexico, Bermuda, Guatemala, Costa Rica, Australia and the Virgin Islands. Bonnier is owned by Sweden-based Bonnier Group, a globally operating conglomerate with more than 200 years in publishing.

Brands and events
Publications owned by Bonnier LLC include:

 Boating
 Cruising World
 "Florida Travel + Life"
 "Islands"
 Marlin
 Sailing World
 Salt Water Sportsman
 Sport Fishing
 Wakeboarding
 Yachting

Events operated by Bonnier LLC include:

 Helly Hansen Sailing World Regatta Series
 Marlin University
 Open Season Sportsman's Expo
 Sand Sports Super Show

Former

 American Photo
 Baby Talk
 Boating Life 
 Caribbean Travel & Life
 Conceive
 Fly Fishing in Salt Waters 
 Garden Design
 Home Ft. Lauderdale
 Home Miami Kiteboarding Meeting Traveler MotorBoating NewBoats.com
 Parenting
 Popular Photography
 Power Cruising
 QUAD
 Resorts & Great Hotels
 Science Illustrated Skiing Ski SNOW Spa Transworld Skateboarding Transworld Snowboarding Transworld Business Transworld Motocross Ride BMX UsedBoats.com
 WindSurfing
 YachtBroker.com
 Field & Stream Outdoor Life Popular Science SHOT Business Saveur''

References

External links
 

 
Companies based in Orange County, Florida
Magazine publishing companies of the United States
Publishing companies established in 2007
American companies established in 2007
2007 establishments in Florida
Winter Park, Florida
American subsidiaries of foreign companies